Julius Gitahi (born 29 April 1978 in Nyeri, Central Province) is a Kenyan long-distance runner.

International competitions

External links

1978 births
Living people
Kenyan male long-distance runners
Kenyan male cross country runners
Kenyan male marathon runners
Olympic male long-distance runners
Olympic athletes of Kenya
Athletes (track and field) at the 2000 Summer Olympics
African Games gold medalists for Kenya
African Games gold medalists in athletics (track and field)
Athletes (track and field) at the 1999 All-Africa Games
Goodwill Games medalists in athletics
Competitors at the 1998 Goodwill Games
Japan Championships in Athletics winners
People from Nyeri County
20th-century Kenyan people
21st-century Kenyan people